This is a list of people from Genoa, Italy. Genoa is the capital of the Italian region of Liguria and the sixth-largest city in Italy. In 2015, 594,733 people lived within the city's administrative limits. As of the 2011 Italian census, the Province of Genoa, which in 2015 became the Metropolitan City of Genoa, counted 855,834 resident persons. Over 1.5 million people live in the wider metropolitan area stretching along the Italian Riviera.

Artists

Architects
 Leon Battista Alberti, architect, humanist author, and polymath
 Carlo Barabino, architect
 Lorenzo Mongiardino, architect, interior designer
 Renzo Piano, architect
 Renzo Picasso, architect and urban planner

Musicians
 Carlo Abbate, music theorist and composer
 Fabrizio De André, singer-songwriter
 Pippo Barzizza, composer, arranger, conductor and music director
 Umberto Bindi, singer-songwriter
 Angelo Branduardi, folk singer, moved to Genoa at a young age
 Perceval Doria, Genoese troubadour
 Simon Doria, Genoese troubadour
 Bonifaci Calvo, Genoese troubadour
 Lanfranc Cigala, Genoese troubadour, man of letters
 Ivano Fossati, singer-songwriter
 Dany Franchi, blues guitarist, singer and songwriter
 Luchetto Gattilusio, Genoese troubadour
 Jacme Grils, Genoese troubadour
 Luca Grimaldi, Genoese troubadour
 Angelo Francesco Lavagnino, composer
 Simone Molinaro, composer
 Natalino Otto, singer
 Niccolò Paganini, violinist and musical genius
 Calega Panzan, Genoese troubadour
 Gino Paoli, singer-songwriter, moved to Genoa at a young age
 Tedua, rapper
 Luigi Tenco, singer-songwriter, moved to Genoa at a young age

Painters

 Enrico Accatino, painter, sculptor, designer
 Luca Cambiaso, painter
 Fra Simone da Carnuli, painter
 Valerio Castello, painter
 Giovanni Benedetto Castiglione, painter
 Edoardo Chiossone, engraver and painter
 Giuseppe Fraschieri, painter
 Giovanni Battista Gaulli, painter
 James Charles Harris, painter
 Alessandro Magnasco, painter
 Giovanni Stefano Maia, painter
 Domenico Piola, painter
 Ernesto Rayper, painter and engraver
 Emilio Scanavino, painter
 Bernardo Strozzi, painter

Sculptors
 Anton Maria Maragliano, sculptor
 Filippo Parodi, sculptor

Writers

 Dino Campana, poet, Genoa is a recurring theme of the Dino Campana's poetry
 Giorgio Caproni, poet, moved to Genoa at a young age
 Piero Jahier, poet, translator, journalist
 Eugenio Montale, poet, Nobel Prize winner
 Fernanda Pivano, writer, translator and critic
 Felice Romani, poet, wrote many librettos for the Opera
 Edoardo Sanguineti, poet

Other
 Giovan Battista Carpi, comics artist
 Felice delle Piane, art historian
 Alberto Terrile, photographer
 Antoinette Van Leer Polk, Baroness
 Girolamo Vassallo, engraver and coin-maker

Business
Enrico Piaggio, industrialist

Entertainment

Actors
 George Eastman, actor
 Vittorio Gassman, actor
 Gilberto Govi, actor
 Beppe Grillo, actor, political activist
 Liliana Ross, Italian-born Chilean actress (La Colorina, Machos)
 Paolo Villaggio, actor

Film production
 Pietro Germi, film director
 Emanuele Luzzati, production designer, illustrator
 Enrico Casarosa, storyboard artist, film director

Explorers

 Enrico Alberto d'Albertis, explorer and naturalist
 Luigi D'Albertis, explorer and naturalist
 John Cabot, Genoese explorer and navigator
 Christopher Columbus, explorer and navigator
 Giacomo Doria, explorer, naturalist, botanist
 Henry, Count of Malta, Genoese adventurer
 Lancelotto Malocello, explorer and navigator
 António de Noli, explorer and navigator
 Antoniotto Usodimare, Genoese explorer
 Vandino and Ugolino Vivaldi, Genoese explorers and merchants

Families and noble houses

 Adorno family
 Cavanna family
 Cybo family
 Delle Piane family
 Doria family
 Durazzo family
 Fieschi family
 Gattilusi family
 Ghisolfi family
 House of Grimaldi
 Imperiali family
 House of Spinola

Military

 Alamanno da Costa, admiral
 Andrea Doria, condottiero and admiral
 Lamba Doria, Genoese admiral who defeated the Venetians in the Battle of Curzola
 Guglielmo Embriaco, merchant and military leader
 Stefanina Moro, resistance member during World War II
 Luigi Durand de la Penne, naval diver during World War II
 Raffaele Rossetti, engineer and military naval officer
 Athanase-Charles-Marie Charette de la Contrie, French royalist, noble, military commander of the Papal Zouaves

Patriotic figures
 Balilla, Genoese boy who started the revolt against the Habsburgs
 Nino Bixio, patriot
 Goffredo Mameli, patriot, author of Italian national anthem, Il Canto degli Italiani
 Giuseppe Mazzini, patriot, politician, journalist, writer, activist

Political

 Prince of Belmonte
 Simone Boccanegra, Doge of Genoa
Giovanni Battista Borea d'Olmo, politician
 Giuseppe Dossetti, jurist, politician, Catholic priest
Bartolomeo di Passano, senator of the Republic of Genoa
 Gaetano Perillo, politician
 Caffaro di Rustico da Caschifellone, diplomat
 Palmiro Togliatti, politician

Religious
 Andrea Gallo, presbyter
 Catherine of Genoa, saint and mystic
Baldassare Ravaschieri, Roman Catholic priest, beatified in 1930
 Giuseppe Siri, Archbishop of Genoa

Popes
 Pope Adrian V
 Pope Benedict XV
 Pope Innocent IV
 Pope Innocent VIII

Science and academia

 Franco Malerba, astronaut, first citizen of Italy to travel to space.
 Giovanni Battista Baliani, mathematician, physicist and astronomer
 Massimo Boninsegni, physicist
 Luigi Luca Cavalli-Sforza, geneticist
 Germano Celant, art historian
 Laura Crispini, geologist and Antarctic researcher
 Alberto Diaspro, physicist and engineer
 Ausonio Franchi, philosopher and editor
 Riccardo Giacconi, astrophysics, Nobel Prize in Physics
 Lorenzo Pareto, geologist and statesman
 David Veronese, economist
 Valter Longo, biogerontologist and cell biologist

Sport
Federico Chiesa, football player
Ezio Borgo, football player
Luigi Cappanera, retired football player
Francesca Carbone, 400m athlete
Emilio Gattoronchieri, footballer
Oliviero Mascheroni, footballer
Mattia Monticone, footballer
Matteo Rossi, footballer
Fabio Valente, footballer
Mario Ventimiglia, footballer

References

Genoa